Suppanad Jittaleela (born February 12, 1991, in Ratchaburi Province, Thailand) is a Thai actress, DJ, model and singer (The Painter band), who became famous after playing the lead role of "Kim" from the movie Yes or No (2010) which was her first movie and Yes or No 2 (2012). Because of the success of her movie, she became famous across Asia especially in China. She is currently attending at Rangsit University (Faculty of Arts).

Tina is one of the casts of a new drama under Media Channel which title is Sood Rak Plick Lock. She is also one of the casts of Japanese-Thai movie about music, drama and romance entitled, Love Sud Jin Fun Sugoi where famous rock band singer Makoto Koshinaka is also one of the characters together with Apinnya Sakuljarunsoek and Tao Sattaphong Phiangpor. Love Sud Jin Fin Sugoi will be released next year. Another movie of Tina is the second installment of the famous horror movie titled, "3am".  "The Convent" is the last part of this movie, in this film, Tina will play a role of a student who wants to redeem her wish in terms of success in love. "3am Part 2 3D" was said to be released on January 16, 2014, in Thailand. Like the success of the first 3am, it might also be released in outside Thailand like Taiwan, Hong Kong, Macau, Cambodia, Indonesia and China.

Personal life
Tina’s full name is Suppanad Jittaleela. She was born on February 12, 1991, in Ratchaburi, Thailand. She is about 170 cm tall. Jittaleela moved to Bangkok after she finished primary school. There she studied at Satriwithaya School until she graduated, and then  studied software engineering at Chiang Mai University. However, she stopped before graduating because of her job, but she is determined to keep studying. She graduated with a degree in Communication Arts at Rangsit University on December 13, 2015.

Jittaleela was given the “Kim” character role because she has a more natural girl voice than other tomboy actresses.

A lot of people noticed her tomboy style. Also, people are questioning her about her sexual orientation after the success of her movie Yes or No and as what she said on her interviews.

Jittaleela is a former DJ at Pynk FM. She also used to be a runway model before getting starring in films. She is more popular outside Thailand, mostly in China and other Chinese countries such as Hong Kong and Taiwan. However, Jittaleela is now one of the rising stars in Thailand and gaining more and more popularity recently.

On September 26, 2016, at the actress hometown in Ratchaburi a fire incident burned down the family's home and killed her parents.

References

External links

 Tina Suppanad on Instagram

1991 births
Living people
Suppanad Jittaleela
Suppanad Jittaleela
Suppanad Jittaleela
Suppanad Jittaleela
Suppanad Jittaleela